Yennifer Frank Casañas Hernández (born 18 October 1978) is a Spanish discus thrower. He represented Cuba until May 2008, then Spain.

Career
In the 2008 Olympic Games he competed for Spain, reaching the fifth position in the final.

His personal best throw is 67.91 metres, which he achieved in June 2008 in Castellón.

Achievements

References

External links
 
 
 
 

1978 births
Living people
Cuban male discus throwers
Spanish male discus throwers
Spanish people of Cuban descent
Athletes (track and field) at the 2000 Summer Olympics
Athletes (track and field) at the 2004 Summer Olympics
Athletes (track and field) at the 2008 Summer Olympics
Athletes (track and field) at the 2012 Summer Olympics
Athletes (track and field) at the 2016 Summer Olympics
Athletes (track and field) at the 1999 Pan American Games
Athletes (track and field) at the 2003 Pan American Games
Olympic athletes of Cuba
Olympic athletes of Spain
Pan American Games medalists in athletics (track and field)
Pan American Games silver medalists for Cuba
Mediterranean Games gold medalists for Spain
Mediterranean Games medalists in athletics
Athletes (track and field) at the 2009 Mediterranean Games
Athletes (track and field) at the 2018 Mediterranean Games
Central American and Caribbean Games silver medalists for Cuba
Competitors at the 1998 Central American and Caribbean Games
Central American and Caribbean Games medalists in athletics
Medalists at the 2003 Pan American Games